The Rugby League XIII was an invitation team run along the same lines as the Rugby Union Barbarians team.

Particularly in the Second World War, when international fixtures were restricted to England V Wales. The Rugby League would play representative games such as the famous fixture  Rugby League XIII against Northern Command XIII at Thrum Hall, Halifax on Saturday 21 March 1942.

See also

References

Rugby league teams